Rafid Badr Al-Deen Ahmad  (born 30 September 1976) is an Iraqi football defender who played for Arbil FC in Iraq from 2000 to 2009.

References 

Iraqi footballers
1976 births
Living people
Association football defenders
Iraq international footballers